Sphenomorphus buettikoferi  is a species of skink, a lizard in the family Scincidae. The species is endemic to the island of Borneo.

Etymology
The specific name, buettikoferi, is in honor of Swiss zoologist Johann Büttikofer.

Geographic range
On the island of Borneo, S. buettikoferi is found in Kalimantan and Sarawak.

Habitat
The preferred natural habitat of S. buettikoferi is forest.

Reproduction
The mode of reproduction of S. buettikoferi is unknown.

References

Further reading
Das I (2004). Lizards of Borneo: A Pocket Guide. Kota Kinabalu, Borneo: Natural History Publications. 89 pp. . ("Sphenomorphus buettikoferi [sic]").
Lidth de Jeude TW (1905). "Zoological results of the Dutch Scientific Expedition to Central Borneo. — The Reptiles". Notes from the Leyden Museum 25: 187–202. ("Lygosoma Büttikoferi [sic]", new species, pp. 193–194).
Mittleman MB (1952). "A generic synopsis of the lizards of the subfamily Lygosominae". Smithsonian Miscellaneous Collections 117 (17): 1–35. ("Sphenomorphus buttikoferi [sic]", new combination, p. 23).

buettikoferi
Reptiles described in 1905
Taxa named by Theodorus Willem van Lidth de Jeude
Reptiles of Borneo